Li Aiyue (born 15 August 1970) is a Chinese judoka. She competed at the 1992 Summer Olympics and the 1996 Summer Olympics.

References

1970 births
Living people
Chinese female judoka
Olympic judoka of China
Judoka at the 1992 Summer Olympics
Judoka at the 1996 Summer Olympics
Place of birth missing (living people)
Asian Games medalists in judo
Judoka at the 1990 Asian Games
Judoka at the 1994 Asian Games
Asian Games silver medalists for China
Medalists at the 1990 Asian Games
Medalists at the 1994 Asian Games
20th-century Chinese women
21st-century Chinese women